National Millennium Trails are 17 short- and long-distance trails selected from 58 nominees as visionary trails that reflect defining aspects of America's history and culture.  The trails were chosen on June 26, 1999, by the White House Millennium Council and announced by U.S. Transportation Secretary Rodney Slater at the second international Trails and Greenways Conference in Pittsburgh, PA.

Unicoi Turnpike –  – from Murphy, North Carolina westward to Vonore, Tennessee exploring the Cherokee Trail of Tears
Cascadia Marine Trail –  – from Olympia, Washington to Point Roberts, Washington at the Canada–United States border tracing early Native American trade routes in the Puget Sound region.
Juan Bautista de Anza National Historic Trail –  – from Nogales, Arizona northwestward to San Francisco, California marks the route of Spain's exploration and settlement led by Juan Bautista de Anza
Freedom Trail –  – from Boston Common to Bunker Hill Monument in Boston, Massachusetts connecting 15 sites of great significance in the Colonial history of the United States.
Lewis and Clark National Historic Trail –  – from Camp DuBois at Wood River, Illinois westward to Les Shirley Park, Oregon commemorating the Lewis and Clark Expedition of 1804 to 1806.
Underground Railroad – various routes through the eastern United States, Texas, Oklahoma, southern Canada, Mexico and the Caribbean representing the Underground Railroad escape routes for people held in slavery prior to the American Civil War.
Civil War Discovery Trail – 500 sites in 27 states – honors the sacrifices and hardships of the American Civil War.
International Express –  – Queens County, New York from Sunnyside to Flushing follows the route of the New York City Subway's IRT Flushing Line, an underground and elevated subway line which was built to redistribute the large numbers of recent immigrants in the early 1900s.
Appalachian National Scenic Trail –  – Springer Mountain, Georgia to Mt. Katahdin, Maine this forested trail is the longest natural public thoroughfare in the world
Great Western Trail –  – Canada–US border southward to the Mexico–US border through Montana, Idaho, Wyoming, Utah and Arizona
North Country National Scenic Trail –  – from Lake Sakakawea, North Dakota eastward to Port Henry, New York traversing the different types of landscapes that define the northern rim of the continental United States.
Hatfield–McCoy Trail System –  through West Virginia, Kentucky and Virginia along the mountain ridges and abandoned coal mining fields of southern West Virginia
East Coast Greenway –  – Key West, Florida northward to Calais, Maine connecting 15 of America's most populous states and most major cities on the eastern seaboard.
Mississippi River Trail –  – from Lake Itasca, Minnesota southward to New Orleans, Louisiana honors one of the world's longest rivers.
American Discovery Trail –  from Cape Henlopen State Park, Delaware westward to Point Reyes National Seashore, California
Pacific Northwest Trail –  from the Continental Divide in Montana to the Pacific Ocean on Washington’s Olympic Coast.
First Lady Hillary Clinton said about the designations:
Through the Millennium Trails project, we are building and maintaining trails that tell the story of our nation's past and will help to create a positive vision for our future. The 16 National Millennium Trails that [the Secretary of Transportation] designated today are all visionary projects that define us as Americans.''

References

External links 
Program Overview
Millennium Trails: Connecting America's Communities
White House Millennium Trails Announcement

Buildings and structures celebrating the third millennium